Jawornik Polski  is a village in Przeworsk County, Subcarpathian Voivodeship, in south-eastern Poland. It is the seat of the gmina (administrative district) called Gmina Jawornik Polski.

References

Jawornik Polski
Ruthenian Voivodeship
Kingdom of Galicia and Lodomeria
Lwów Voivodeship